The 1997 Vuelta a Burgos was the 19th edition of the Vuelta a Burgos road cycling stage race, which was held from 18 August to 22 August 1997. The race started and finished in Burgos. The race was won by Laurent Jalabert of the  team.

General classification

References

Vuelta a Burgos
1997 in road cycling
1997 in Spanish sport